was one of 18   escort destroyers built for the Imperial Japanese Navy (IJN) during World War II. Completed in late 1944, the ship began convoy escort duties in the Shanghai, China, area early the following year. After being damaged by a naval mine in April 1945, she returned home for repairs the following month. Tsubaki was damaged when American aircraft attacked targets in Japan in July and was not repaired before the end of the war several months later. The ship was scrapped in 1948.

Design and description
Designed for ease of production, the Matsu class was smaller, slower and more lightly armed than previous destroyers as the IJN intended them for second-line duties like escorting convoys, releasing the larger ships for missions with the fleet. Their crew numbered 210 officers and enlisted men. The ships had two Kampon geared steam turbines, each driving one propeller shaft, using steam provided by two Kampon water-tube boilers.

The main armament of the Matsu-class ships consisted of three  Type 89 dual-purpose guns in one twin-gun mount aft and one single mount forward of the superstructure. The single mount was partially protected against spray by a gun shield. The accuracy of the Type 89 guns was severely reduced against aircraft because no high-angle gunnery director was fitted. The ships carried a total of 25  Type 96 anti-aircraft guns in 4 triple and 13 single mounts. The Matsus were equipped with Type 13 early-warning and Type 22 surface-search radars. The ships were also armed with a single rotating quadruple mount amidships for  torpedoes. They could deliver their 36 depth charges via two stern rails and two throwers.

Construction and career
Authorized in the late 1942 Modified 5th Naval Armaments Supplement Program, Tsubaki (Camellia) was laid down on 20 June 1944 at the Maizuru Naval Arsenal and launched on 30 September. Upon her completion on 30 November, the ship was assigned to Destroyer Squadron 11 of the Combined Fleet for training. She escorted a convoy from Moji, Japan, to Shanghai on 15 February 1945 and then remained in the Shanghai area escorting convoys and patrolling. On 15 March the ship was reassigned to the squadron's Destroyer Division 53. The squadron was briefly attached to the Second Fleet from 1–20 April before rejoining the Combined Fleet. During this time, Tsubaki was moderately damaged when she struck a naval mine in the Yangtze River on 10 April that had been laid by American Boeing B-29 Superfortress bombers.

The ship escorted a convoy to Japan on 30 May when she returned for permanent repairs to Moji. Following their completion she remained in the Seto Inland Sea. Destroyer Division 53 was deactivated on 15 July and Tsubaki was moderately damaged by American carrier aircraft from Task Force 38 near Okayama when they attacked targets around the Inland Sea on 24 July. The ship had to be towed to Kure for repairs although they were not completed before the end of the war in August. She was turned over to Allied forces there at the time of the surrender of Japan on 2 September and was stricken from the navy list on 30 November. Tsubaki was broken up at Kure beginning on 28 July 1948.

Notes

Bibliography

 

 
 

Matsu-class destroyers
Ships built by Maizuru Naval Arsenal
World War II destroyers of Japan
1944 ships